Peter Rutledge Koch, also known simply as Peter Koch (born 1943) is an American letterpress master printmaker, artists' book publisher and small book publisher, typographer, educator, and designer. Koch is Internationally known for his artist books. Over the years he has had different business names, including Peter Rutledge Koch, Typographic Design; Peter and the Wolf Editions; Editions Koch; Hormone Derange Editions; Last Chance Gulch; and Peter Koch Printer.

Biography 
Peter Rutledge Koch was born on November 15, 1943 in Missoula, Montana. In 1974, he co-founded Black Stone Press in Missoula, Montana; alongside his first wife Shelley Jean Hoyt. His early work was the publication of the letterpress literary journal, Montana Gothic (1974–1977).

He moved in 1979 with his press to San Francisco and became an apprentice to Adrian Wilson in North Beach. Black Stone Press was dissolved by 1984, and his press was renamed Peter Rutledge Koch, Typographic Design. In January 1990, following the 1989 Loma Prieta earthquake, he changed his press name to Peter Koch Printers and moved the location to Berkeley, California.

From 1991 to 2011, he taught classes about artist books at University of California, Berkeley (UC Berkeley). Koch has extensive knowledge on typography, paper making, printmaking, bookbinding, and the design of books. In 2005, Koch and his wife, Susan Filter founded the Codex Foundation, dedicated to the preservation and support of artist books. The Codex Foundation has hosted the biennial CODEX International Book Fair since 2007. 

The Cecil H. Green Library at Stanford University hosted the exhibition, Peter Koch Printer: A Forty-year Retrospective (2017). The Grolier Club presented the exhibition, Peter Koch Printer Retrospective (2019). The Black Stone Press archives (from 1974 to 1982) are housed at the University of Delaware Library Archives and Special Collections.

Personal life 
Koch was previously married to printer Shelley Jean Hoyt, from 1975 to 1984. Together they had one son. As of 2005, he is married to Susan K. Filter, who works as a paper conservator.

Publications 
A select list of publications by Koch.

Books

Portfolios

See also 
 David Lance Goines
List of book arts centers

References

External links 
 Black Stone Press archive, 1974-1984

1943 births
21st-century American printmakers
People from Missoula, Montana
University of California, Berkeley faculty
American publishers (people)
American typographers and type designers
Letterpress printmakers
Living people